Norbelis Jossiebel Lameda (born 26 June 1988) is a Venezuelan  musician (trumpet), composer, arranger and jazz teacher.

Biography
Lameda is educated at UPEL Instituto Pedagógico de Barquisimeto. In 2010, after working as a music teacher for several institutions, she founded Pandijazz, a jazz school for children. The project has gained attention throughout Venezuela and abroad, and is considered to be the only jazz school of its kind in South America.

References

1988 births
Living people
Venezuelan educators